Zou Zheng (born 7 February 1988) is a Chinese footballer who currently plays for Chinese League One side Sichuan Jiuniu.

Club career
Zou Zheng started his football career playing for Qingdao Jonoon's youth academy in 2001. He moved to Auckland with his parents between 2002 and 2005. He returned to Qingdao Jonoon and was promoted to the first team during the 2007 season. He made his debut for the club on 4 November 2007 in a 2–2 draw against Shenzhen Xiangxue. The following season saw him gain significant playing time as a substitute, which also led to him scoring his first goal for the club on 15 September 2008 in a 2–1 win against Dalian Shide. His progression would continue the following season due to his versatility which saw him become a regular for the club.

On 24 December 2014, Zou transferred to Chinese Super League side Guangzhou Evergrande. He made his debut for the club on 9 March 2015 in a 2–1 win against Shijiazhuang Ever Bright. Zou scored his first goal for the club on 20 June 2015 in a 2–1 win against Shandong Luneng Taishan; however, he was also sent off during  stoppage time. On 21 September 2015, Zou scored his second goal of the season in a 2–1 win against Guangzhou R&F. Zou made thirty appearances for Guangzhou and won his first Super League and AFC Champions League titles at the end of the 2015 season.

On 17 December 2015, Zou suffered a fibula fracture and dislocation of an ankle joint in his left leg during the 2015 FIFA Club World Cup semifinals against Barcelona when he was knocked off balance by Luis Suárez. He received surgery twice in Japan on 18 December 2015 and 4 January 2016 respectively. Zou made his return from injury on 15 October 2016 in a 6–0 away win against Shijiazhuang Ever Bright. On 15 July 2017, he scored the winning goal in a 2–1 home win against Shandong Luneng. Zou was linked with a transfer to Tianjin Quanjian after the 2017 season. However, he eventually stayed at the club following a series of disagreements between Guangzhou Evergrande, Tianjin Quanjian and Shanghai Shenhua.

On 28 February 2019, Zou transferred to fellow top tier side Guangzhou R&F, signing a three-year contract.

International career
Zou made his debut for the Chinese national team on 8 September 2015 in a 3-0 win against Maldives during 2018 FIFA World Cup qualification.

Career statistics

Club statistics
.

International statistics

Honours

Club
Guangzhou Evergrande
Chinese Super League: 2015, 2016, 2017
AFC Champions League: 2015
Chinese FA Cup: 2016
Chinese FA Super Cup: 2016, 2017, 2018

References

External links
 
 
Player stats at Sohu.com

1988 births
Living people
Chinese footballers
Footballers from Qingdao
Qingdao Hainiu F.C. (1990) players
Guangzhou F.C. players
Guangzhou City F.C. players
Qingdao F.C. players
Chinese Super League players
China League One players
China international footballers
Association football defenders